KZNW is a Regional Mexican formatted broadcast radio station licensed to Oak Harbor, Washington, serving Anacortes, Bellingham, Everett, Port Townsend and the San Juan Islands in Washington. KZNW is owned and operated by Bustos Media.

References

External links

2016 establishments in Washington (state)
ZNW (FM)
Radio stations established in 2016
ZNW (FM)
Regional Mexican radio stations in the United States